The September 11 Great Armed Clan Feud of Matian （Chinese:马田“9.11”宗派大械斗）was a 1993 armed feud between local villagers from 6 townships in Matian, Chenzhou, Hunan, China. It began on 'September 11, 8:30 Beijing time, and lasted for 34 hours. Thousands of peasants fought with dynamite, homemade guns, cannons and other weapons. More than 1,000 police were dispatched to dispensed the crowd.

The tension between the rival Matian and Jinggang villages can be traced back to 1928, when a warlord from Matian killed 27 peasants from Jinggang in the name of cleaning Communists. Chenzhou, Hunan was also a hotspot for clan feuds. Incomplete statics between 1987 and 1988 show there were 1,505 big clan feuds in Chengzhou that caused 83 death, 805 injures and 113 buildings burnt.

On Sept 8th, a child died from a brawl between Jinggang and Matian villagers. The two villages soon began to prepare for battle, build fortifications and bunkers, digging trenches, controlling hilltops and inviting friendly clans. The battle broke out in the morning of September 11th. Artillery fire covered an area of 2 square kilometers. Several multiple floor buildings and stores were bombed. Both sides raided nearby coal mines for explosives and raw material for homemade guns and cannons.

The Beijing–Guangzhou railway, a major national artery, was stopped for 5 hours. 5 died  and dozens more seriously injured. Police evacuated the surrounded Jinggang villagers with tear gas breaking the crowd. After the fight stopped, police arrested 12 major conspirers and confiscated dozens of homemade cannons and guns, hundreds of kilograms of dynamite, and numerous other weapons and other war materials.

In 2009 almost 200 peasants from the two villages were ready for another battle but the government successfully mediated the conflict.

Notes

1993 crimes in China
History of Hunan
Conflicts in 1993